Regeneration is a 1997 British film, an adaptation of the 1991 novel of the same name by Pat Barker. The film is directed by Gillies MacKinnon.  It was released as Behind the Lines in the US in 1998. The film follows the stories of a number of officers of the British Army during World War I who are brought together in Craiglockhart War Hospital where they are treated for various traumas. It features the story of Siegfried Sassoon, his open letter reprinted in The Times criticising the conduct of the war and his return to the front.

Plot
The film starts with Siegfried Sassoon's open letter (Finished with the War: A Soldier's Declaration) dated July 1917, inveighing "against the political errors and insincerities for which the fighting men are being sacrificed". The letter has been published in The Times and received much attention because Sassoon is considered a hero for (perhaps suicidally rash) acts of valour; and has received the Military Cross, which Sassoon throws away. With the string-pulling and guidance of Robert Graves, a fellow poet and friend, the army sends Sassoon to Craiglockhart War Hospital, a psychiatric facility, rather than court-martialling him. There, Sassoon meets Dr. William Rivers, a Freudian psychiatrist who encourages his patients to express their war memories as therapy.

There is no clear main character, but a focus on several: Billy Prior, Siegfried Sassoon and Rivers. A secondary character, Wilfred Owen, is linked to Sassoon's storyline.

Prior, at first an unsympathetic character, presents a challenge to Rivers, who needs to discover what experience caused Prior's dumbness. Prior regains his speech suddenly then looks for female companionship and begins a relationship with Sarah, a munitions worker. He has a strong sense of social class, setting himself apart from the other officers and referring to incidents that caused him to mistrust the authorities. There are references to different treatment for privates and officers, including Craiglockhart itself, which caters for officers. When Prior is ready for hypnosis, he and Rivers discover that his trauma was caused by the death of one of his men, killed by a bomb. Prior lost his speech after picking up the private's eyeball and asked what should be done with "this gobstopper". This surprises Prior who had expected his condition to be caused by something for which he was responsible. He feels he has to return to active duty to prove to himself and others that he is as competent as before.

Sassoon becomes friends with another patient, Wilfred Owen. Owen aspires to be a poet and respects Sassoon's work; Sassoon agrees to help with his poetry.

Meanwhile, Rivers takes a leave of absence and visits Lewis Yealland's practice in London. Yealland treats his patients, who are privates, not like traumatised people but machines which need to be repaired quickly. Rivers sits in on experimental electric stimulation therapy sessions on a private, who, like Prior, has lost his speech. The treatment involved using electric current applied to the oral cavity of a patient in order to stimulate speech in the mute patient. Rivers is repulsed by the treatments' brutality and continues to produce what Sassoon calls his "gentle miracles" but at the cost of his own mental health, in contrast to Yealland, who lacks empathy but is proud of his success in treating mutism.

Sassoon, although he still disagrees with the war's continuation, decides to return to France to care for his men.

During the Review Board's evaluation of Sassoon, Rivers is surprised by Sassoon's insistence that he has not changed his mind. As such, he still meets the previous assessment of mental illness. However, Sassoon did not truly qualify as mentally ill and wishes to return to the war. Rivers qualifies Sassoon as being fit. Sassoon is seen being injured and laughing; to his men's consternation. The extent of the injury is only resolved when Rivers reads a letter from him after the war.

In the meantime, Prior goes before the Board and is assigned to home duties, probably because of asthma, which means he cannot be sure whether he is cured. He is last seen in bed with Sarah.

The final scenes show Wilfred Owen's body in France after the war and Rivers' sadness on hearing of it. He is seen crying as he reads Owen's "The Parable of the Old Man and the Young" sent by Sassoon. The visual motif of a canal tunnel which has been Owen's dream is now resolved. Unlike other patients' dreams which are the visualisations of the traumatic events causing their breakdowns, Owen's is the premonition of his death.

Cast
 Jonathan Pryce as Capt. William Rivers
 James Wilby as 2nd Lt. Siegfried Sassoon
 Jonny Lee Miller as 2nd Lt. Billy Prior
 Stuart Bunce as 2nd Lt. Wilfred Owen
 Tanya Allen as Sarah
 David Hayman as Maj. Bryce
 Dougray Scott as Capt. Robert Graves
 John Neville as Dr. Yealland
 Barry C Harper as  Dead German boy*

Reception
Karin E. Westman highlighted some shortcomings of the film in relation to the book on which it is based. Several reviewers drew attention to the way that the film ignored the question of Prior's ambiguous sexuality, which becomes clear in the second and third books of Barker's trilogy. Philip French in The Observer called it "a superb film" and praised the "quiet authority" of Mackinnon's directing style.

A BBC reviewer praised Regeneration as "a film that achieves its power through understatement" and called Miller's performance "superb". Empire called it "a worthy, often engrossing tale, delicately acted and beautifully shot". The reviewer added that Wilby was "very good, bristling with upper class righteous indignation", Pryce was "on top form" and Miller "impressive". Time Out has called the film "subtle, elegant and sharply intelligent", and noted "marvellous performances all round". Several reviewers referred to the convincing depiction of trench warfare.

Awards
During the 1997 BAFTA awards, Regeneration was nominated for the Alexander Korda Award for Best British Film but lost to Gary Oldman's Nil by Mouth. During the 1998 British Independent Film Awards, Jonathan Pryce was nominated for Best Performance by a British Actor in an Independent Film, Gillies MacKinnon was also nominated in the Best British Director of an Independent Film category. Because the film was a British-Canadian co-production, Regeneration received various nominations at the Canadian Genie Awards, including Best Achievement in Direction (Gillies MacKinnon), Best Motion Picture (Allan Scott, Peter Simpson), Best Music Score (Mychael Danna), Best Performance by an Actor in a Leading Role (Jonathan Pryce) and Best Screenplay (Allan Scott).

References

External links
 
 
 

1997 films
Canadian war drama films
Anti-war films about World War I
British war drama films
1997 drama films
English-language Canadian films
Films based on British novels
Films set in Edinburgh
Films set in 1917
Films set in 1918
Western Front (World War I) films
Films set on the United Kingdom home front during World War I
World War I films based on actual events
Films directed by Gillies MacKinnon
British historical drama films
1990s historical films
Biographical films about poets
Canadian historical drama films
1990s English-language films
Canadian World War I films
1990s Canadian films
1990s British films